Batuan may refer to:

Places
 Batuan, Bali, a village in Indonesia famous for paintings
 Batuan, Bohol, a municipality in Bohol province, Philippines
 Batuan, Masbate, a municipality in Masbate province, Philippines
 Batuan, Juban, an inactive volcano in Juban municipality, Philippines
 Batuan, Chaling, a township in Chaling County, Hunan, China

Other uses
 Garcinia binucao, a plant species also known as batuan or binukaw

See also 
 Butuan, a city in the region of Caraga, Philippines